Tatiana Goricheva (born 1947) is a Russian philosopher, theologian, dissident and feminist. She was editor of Woman and Russia: An Almanac for Women about Women, the feminist samizdat journal, as well as a founder of the Mariia club.

Life
Goricheva studied at Leningrad State University, where she was taught by Boris Paramonov. Her initial specialism was French and German existentialism, and she corresponded with Martin Heidegger. In 1973 she started a religious-philosophical seminar with her then husband, Viktor Krivulin, which became a dissident religious group "37", publishing a samizdat journal under the same title.

In 1974 she converted to the Russian Orthodox Church.

She collaborated with Tatiana Mamonova on the feminist samizdat journal Woman and Russia, which appeared in 1979. After Mamonova's expulsion from the Soviet Union, she and Leningrad colleagues formed a women's group known as the Mariia club. After Goricheva was forced to emigrate from the Soviet Union in 1980, she settled in Paris. There she founded the philosophical and religious journal Conversations, which was published from 1983 to 1991.

Goricheva characterizes modern Western culture as 'post-nihilistic', in its indifference to religion. However, she sees this disinterest in the sacred as potentially itself akin to Christ's kenosis, allowing mundane things to be newly invested with spiritual meaning. Following Peter Sloterdijk's Critique of Cynical Reason, she diagnoses contemporary culture as displaying a conventional cynicism (contemporary). She contrasts this to the individual freedom and unconventionality of the ancient cynics, which points the way to the uncompromising radicalism of the 'holy fool':

Works
 Talking about God is dangerous: my experiences in the East and in the West. 1986.
 Cry of the spirit : witnesses to faith in the Soviet Union. 1989.

References

1947 births
Living people
Saint Petersburg State University alumni
Russian feminists
Russian theologians
Russian Orthodox Christians from Russia
20th-century Eastern Orthodox theologians
Women Christian theologians
Soviet emigrants to France